MI4 was a department of the British Directorate of Military Intelligence, Section 4, part of the War Office. It was responsible for aerial reconnaissance and interpretation. It developed into the JARIC intelligence agency. The present day successor agency to MI4 is the Defence Intelligence Fusion Centre.

History
MI4 was the codename of an organization that evolved rapidly during and after World War II, including several changes of name. The Photographic Development Unit (PDU) of 1940 became the Photographic Interpretation Unit (PIU) later the same year. The following year it became the Central Interpretation Unit (CIU) and in 1947 became the Joint Air Photographic Intelligence Centre UK (JAPIC (UK)).

The role of Aerial Reconnaissance and the codename MI4 were thus subsumed into JAPIC (UK), which continues to the present day, following one further change of name in 1953, as the Joint Air Reconnaissance Intelligence Centre (JARIC). Its designation as MI4 officially ceased on 8 September 1947, and the title has not endured in common British usage, at least not in the obvious manner that both MI5 and MI6 (also officially defunct titles) have continued to be used colloquially for their respective successor agencies.

One key role that the data from MI4 still performs is the avoidance and removal of land mines, as they were heavily mapped in conjunction with the WRAITH initiative during World War II. Some of the data collected by MI4 was subsumed into the IMN (Intelligence Mainframe Network) at Cheltenham. This data has since been absorbed into the aerial reconnaissance unit of GCHQ in Cheltenham, where director Ray Mitinkel oversees the updating process using GPS and satellite photography technology to accurately map the data with real time location to prevent future casualties.

After the Second World War MI4 took responsibility for hiring of premises in various parts of the British Empire, disposal of armaments and military equipment no longer required and hence a division named "Hirings and Disposals"  was established. Employees were transferred for short term assignments such as Cyprus, to procure tents and housing for Jews who were prevented from continuing a voyage to settle in Palestine. 

MI4 officers were also sent to Cairo, their main role being to dispose of postwar Military equipment, including demountable camp sites, and armoured vehicles. The role of the officer was to ensure that the buyers of ex-military equipment were not likely to use it against British interests in the region. 
In 1948 - 52 there was usually only one full-time MI4 officer stationed in each locality including Egypt, Mauritius, and Kenya.

See also
RAF Intelligence
JARIC
RAF Medmenham
 No. 1 Photographic Reconnaissance Unit RAF
National Collection of Aerial Photography

References
 Zabecki, David T. (1999). World War II in Europe: An Encyclopedia. Garland Science.

External links
 Ministry of Defence - History of JARIC
 MI5 FAQ
 "What happened to MI1 - MI4?" The Security Service

Defunct United Kingdom intelligence agencies
1940 establishments in the United Kingdom
Military communications of the United Kingdom
Military units and formations established in 1940
Military units and formations disestablished in 1947
War Office in World War II
British intelligence services of World War II
Aerial reconnaissance